The 1985 James Madison Dukes football team was an American football team that represented James Madison University during the 1985 NCAA Division I-AA football season as an independent. In their first year under head coach Joe Purzycki, the team compiled a 5–6 record.

Schedule

References

James Madison
James Madison Dukes football seasons
James Madison Dukes football